Lee Delano (January 19, 1931 – October 8, 2017) was an American character actor.

Delano was born in New York City. He graduated from the Neighborhood Playhouse School of the Theater, where he studied with Sandy Meisner for acting and Martha Graham for dance. His classmates included Joanne Woodward, Susan Oliver and Steve McQueen. McQueen convinced Delano to make the move west to Hollywood where he began to obtain guest roles in episodes of numerous television series, including the original Star Trek in "A Piece of the Action". Delano's tough guy looks and legitimate stage training made him a natural for 'cops and crooks' roles.

In 1968, Sid Caesar hired Delano to replace his longtime improvisational co-star Carl Reiner. Delano co-starred with Caesar on-stage and television around the world, including appearances at the Kraft Music Hall in London, Hollywood Palace, the Kennedy Center in Washington, D.C., and theaters and concert halls throughout the United States. These engagements included a four-month stint with Caesar and Imogene Coca at Michael's Pub Cabaret, and a run on Broadway.

An association with Mel Brooks led to roles in the films High Anxiety (as an orderly with one half a mustache) and Silent Movie. He also appeared in dramatic roles in Report to the Commissioner and Executive Action, in which he played one of three assassins of President John F. Kennedy.

Delano co-founded the Oxford Theater with Jack Donner in Los Angeles. Their students included Barry Levinson, Craig T. Nelson, Barbara Parkins, and Don Johnson.

Filmography

References

External links
 Lee Delano website
 

American male film actors
American male stage actors
American male television actors
Male actors from Los Angeles
Male actors from New York City
1931 births
2017 deaths